Stubborn Love is the first album by Christian singer/songwriter Kathy Troccoli, released in 1982 on Reunion Records.Stubborn Love was reportedly the best-selling debut album by a contemporary Christian music female artist. The title song was a hit on Christian radio reaching number two on the Christian AC chart. The album also features her cover of "You're All I Need to Get By" written by Ashford and Simpson, made famous in 1968 by Marvin Gaye and Tammi Terrell but with Christian lyrics. Stubborn Love was re-issued on CD in 1994 with a new album cover with an updated photo of Troccoli. The album peaked at number 26 on the Billboard Inspirational Albums chart in 1983.

Track listing

Charts

Radio singles

References

1982 debut albums
Kathy Troccoli albums
Reunion Records albums
Albums produced by Brown Bannister